Phoolmoni is a Bengali television soap opera that premiered on 5 September 2016 and airs on Zee Bangla. The series replaced the series Premer Phaande. It was produced by Shibaji Panja and stars Kinni Modak, Subhranshi Suranjana Roy, Moumita Chakraborty, Rumpa Chatterjee and Anamika Chakraborty in main roles and also stars Siddhartha Banerjee, Bharat Kaul, Biswajit Chakraborty and Fahim Mirza in supporting roles.

Plot 
The story of a childless mother named Madhabi who is loved by her entire family is a responsible and a committed house wife, cannot conceive because her husband, Aditya is impotent. She has strong motherly feelings for a kid named Jharon who is the adopted daughter of Batasi, who is a maid at Madhabi's house. Jahron comes to Madhabi's place on the day of a Ganesh Puja, when Jharon wanted some food, while everyone perceived Jharon as a thief, Madhabi could see the little girl who has come to eat some food. On the day of her sister-in-law's baby shower, she is shunned by her relatives as she might be an ill omen for the unborn child. On the other hand, the news of her husband's impotency is covered up smartly by her husband and he starts living with a girl named Anamika. Madhabi is accused vehemently as a woman who is capable of harming the unborn baby. She then is pushed to such a corner that she decides to leave her house she called her own and commit suicide. She fails to commit suicide and eventually finds refuge in the slumg of a woman named Firoza who was her beautician. Here, she comes across Irfan again, Madhabi remembers Irfan from the time he sang at the slum on Eid when Madhabi was invited by Firoza. Irfan is lively boy, a krishore kanti, an energetic guy who helps Madhabi feel comfortable at the slum. Later, Madhabi helps save the slum when it was about to get demolished by the construction company where her husband works. After, Jharon's mother is convicted of murdering her drunkard husband, Madhabi adopts Jharon legally. Her family figures out that Madhabi is she is innocent and the report was forged. When a talk of restabilising Madhabi in the house arises, Madhabi decides to go back but the family doesn't want to accept the child as her own. She then takes on the struggle to establish the kid as her own and give her the name of her husband and the family to which she belongs.

Cast 
 Debjani Modak as Madhabi Debroy
 Subhranshi as Jharon 
 Samrat Mukherjee as Himadri Sanyal
 Siddhartha Banerjee as Aditya Debroy
 Anamika Chakraborty as Anamika
 Bharat Kaul as Sunil Debroy
 Piyali Mitra as Shipra Debroy
 Suranjana Roy as Aditya's Sister in law
 Moumita Chakraborty as Aditya's Aunt
 Rumpa Chatterjee as Aditya's Aunt 
 Shaon Dey as Aditya's Aunt
 Biswajit Chakraborty as Aditya's Uncle
 Fahim Mirza as Amlan
 Elfina Mukherjee as Sonali
 Aditya Roy as Amit
 Bulbuli Panja as Feroza Khatun
 Abhijit Ghosh as Irfan

References

External links 
Phoolmoni at ZEE5

2016 Indian television series debuts
Zee Bangla original programming
2017 Indian television series endings
Bengali-language television programming in India